Joel Dee "Jody" McCrea (September 6, 1934 – April 4, 2009) was an American actor. He was the son of actors Joel McCrea and Frances Dee.

Early life 
 
McCrea was born in Los Angeles, California, the son of actors Joel McCrea and Frances Dee. He was the oldest of three sons. McCrea went to school in Santa Rosa, California, and at New Mexico Military Institute in Roswell, New Mexico. He studied drama at UCLA and served in the United States Army Special Services.

Career 
McCrea had small roles in his father's film, Wichita (1955). He was also in Lucy Gallant (1955). While still at UCLA he had the lead role in Johnny Moccasin (1956), a half hour film made for television by Laslo Benedek as a white boy raised by Indians after a massacre. McCrea followed this with a good supporting role in a feature starring his father, The First Texan (1956).

McCrea studied under Sanford Meisner for two years in New York City. He appeared on television  in Chevron Hall of Stars ("Flowers for Charlie McDaniels"), The George Burns and Gracie Allen Show ("Return to California", "George's Gray Suit", "Fighting for Happiness"), Conflict ("No Man's Road" with Gig Young and Dennis Hopper), Studio One in Hollywood ("Babe in the Woods" – The New York Times said that "his playing was not too resourceful"), Sergeant Preston of the Yukon ("The Criminal Collie"), and Kraft Theatre ("The Last of the Belles").

He had a supporting role in Naked Gun (1956), and The Monster That Challenged the World (1957). He made Trooper Hook (1957) and Gunsight Ridge (1957) with his father and was one of several young names in Lafayette Escadrille (1958) and The Restless Years (1958).

He later briefly hosted Country Style, USA (1957–59), an Army-produced recruiting television program filmed in Nashville, Tennessee, featuring various country music entertainers.

Wichita Town 
In 1959, McCrea costarred with his father in the short-lived NBC western Wichita Town, set in Wichita, Kansas. Joel McCrea appeared as Marshal Mike Dunbar. Jody McCrea did not portray the role of Joel's son on the program but as the deputy marshal, Ben Matheson.

1960s roles 

McCrea had a small role in All Hands on Deck (1961) and could be seen in the episode, "The Wrestler" on the 
ABC situation comedy, Guestward Ho!, starring Joanne Dru.  He toured  the country with The Tiger a production from Moral Rearmament. He did The Moon is Blue and Look Homeward Angel in stock.

McCrea was cast as Lieutenant (later General) John J. Pershing in the 1962 episode, "To Walk with Greatness", on the syndicated television anthology series, Death Valley Days.

In the early 1960s, McCrea guest starred on the CBS game program, I've Got a Secret with Garry Moore. His appearance was part of a group of entertainers related to famous Hollywood personalities.

McCrea had support parts in Force of Impulse (1961) and The Broken Land (1962). 

McCrea made Young Guns of Texas (1962) with James Mitchum, look-alike son of Robert Mitchum, and Alana Ladd, daughter of Alan Ladd. James Mitchum, Alana Ladd and Jody McCrea are billed above the title in that order. The film's supporting cast features Chill Wills and Robert Lowery.

Beach Party films 
McCrea had a supporting role in Operation Bikini (1963) at American International Pictures starring Tab Hunter and Frankie Avalon. He impressed the studio enough for them to cast him in a comedic role as dumb-minded Deadhead (Bonehead) in Beach Party (1963), starring Avalon and Annette Funicello.

When cast in the beach pictures, he realized his comedic potential. When first offered the role of Deadhead, for example, he was quoted at the time as saying that he "wasn't sure what the character would become". McCrea felt that the audience enjoyed Deadhead as they felt superior to him.

McCrea was an avid body builder, and the only actor appearing in the American International Pictures beach movies who could surf.

The film was a big hit, and after appearing in Law of the Lawless (1964) and The Greatest Show on Earth, McCrea reprised his performance as Deadhead in Muscle Beach Party (1964) and Bikini Beach (1964).

He recorded a 45 rpm single in 1964 for Canjo Records to coincide with the film Bikini Beach (side A: "Chicken Surfer"/Side B: "Looney Gooney Bird"). He also wrote a script titled Stage to Nowhere which appears not to have been made.

McCrea played the Big Lunk in the 1964 film Pajama Party, with Tommy Kirk and Annette Funicello in the lead parts.

McCrea had a small part in Young Fury (1965) and played Lieutenant Brannin, a cocky cavalry officer based loosely on George Armstrong Custer, in Sam Peckinpah's Major Dundee (1965), but his scene was deleted from the final cut. He also appeared in Wagon Train ("The Betsy Blee Smith Story"), then returned to AIP beach movies with Beach Blanket Bingo (1965). McCrea played Bonehead, again the same character – but it was his biggest role in the series, having a romance with a mermaid.

McCrea was back as Bonehead in How to Stuff a Wild Bikini (1965), the last Beach Party movie in which he appeared. He was replaced by Aaron Kincaid for Ghost in the Invisible Bikini.

Later films 
McCrea guest starred on Vacation Playhouse ("Three on an Island") and Pistols 'n' Petticoats ("The Pilot"). He had a lead role as a biker in The Glory Stompers (1967), and starred in Sam (1967) for Larry Buchanan. He was a judge on Dream Girl of '67.

McCrea had a supporting role in Scream Free! (1968) and the lead in The Girls from Thunder Strip (1970).

McCrea starred in a Western Cry Blood, Apache (1970) which he also produced. He retired after November Children (1972).

Death 
McCrea became a rancher in Roswell, New Mexico. He came out of retirement to appear in 1981 in Lady Street Fighter.

He died in 2009 of a heart attack at the age of 74. He was married to the former Dusty Ironwing from 1976 until her death in 1996. He raised her children, David  Ironwing and Jaquet Ironwing, as his own.

Filmography

References

External links
 
 Jody McCrea at Brian's Drive-in Theatre
 Obituary at Los Angeles Times

1934 births
2009 deaths
Male actors from Los Angeles
American male film actors
Film producers from California
American male television actors
United States Army soldiers
Male Western (genre) film actors
People from Roswell, New Mexico
20th-century American male actors